The 1943–44 Liga Bet was the fifth season of second tier football in Mandatory Palestine.

The season began on 30 October 1943, and was played until the summer break, on 24 June 1944. Initially seven teams competed in the league, but after several weeks more teams, including reserve teams of Palestine League teams were added to the line-up. By the end of the season, no team played all its matches and the season was never completed.

League table

References

Liga Bet seasons
Palestine
2